Warren Township is one of thirteen townships in St. Joseph County, in the U.S. state of Indiana. As of the 2000 census, its population was 6,430.

Geography

Cities, towns, villages
 South Bend (partial)

Unincorporated towns
 Chain-O-Lakes at 
 Crumstown at 
 Lydick at 
 Westfield at 
(This list is based on USGS data and may include former settlements.)

Adjacent townships
 Bertrand Township, Berrien County, Michigan (north)
 German Township (northeast)
 Portage Township (east)
 Greene Township (south)
 Olive Township (west)

Major highways

Airports and landing strips
 Chain-O-Lakes Airport

Lakes
 Bass Lake
 Chamberlain Lake
 Mud Lake
 South Clear Lake
 Szmanda Lake

School districts
 South Bend Community School Corporation

Political districts
 Indiana's 2nd congressional district
 State House District 8
 State Senate District 8

References
 United States Census Bureau 2008 TIGER/Line Shapefiles
 United States Board on Geographic Names (GNIS)
 IndianaMap

External links
 Indiana Township Association
 United Township Association of Indiana

Townships in St. Joseph County, Indiana
South Bend – Mishawaka metropolitan area
Townships in Indiana